Jesmond Park Academy is a coeducational secondary school and sixth form located in Heaton, Newcastle upon Tyne, England.

The school was formerly known as Heaton Manor School. It was renamed Jesmond Park Academy in 2019.

The school building, fully rebuilt in 2004 from PFI funding replaced two separate sites (known as the Jesmond and Benton sites) which in turn were made up of a number of different schools.

History

Before 2004, Years 7, 8, 9, 12 and 13 were housed on the "Jesmond Site" situated in buildings between Jesmond Park West and Newton Road. The main building was built in the 1920s, with a 1960s gym to the west and another addition to the north of the building, which was attached to it by a bridge walkway.

Years 10 and 11 were housed half a mile away on the "Benton Site", a purpose built 1960s former secondary technical school on Benton Road, opposite the Benton Park View governmental office complex.

Heaton Grammar and Heaton High Schools
The buildings on Newton Road were opened by King George V in 1928 after opening the Tyne Bridge. The school building was symmetrical; everything found on one side of the school was mirrored on the opposite side. The western side of the building was Heaton Grammar School for boys with an entrance on Jesmond Park West and the eastern side of the building was Heaton High School for girls, again with a separate entrance on Newton Road.

Manor Park Technical Grammar School
Across on Benton Road was Manor Park Technical Grammar School opened in 1960, following the Tripartite System of Grammar, Technical Grammar, and Secondary Modern schooling in England. This school, completely separate from Heaton Grammar and High Schools was initially on the Benton Road site only (1960-1966) then from 1967 expanded to encompass two sites itself. The lower site, which was on Addycombe Terrace, is now the Heaton Centre (for adult education) and Heaton Community Centre.

Heaton Manor School 
Newcastle City Council's budget cuts meant that schools with low numbers had to be closed and it was decided to merge Heaton Secondary School with Manor Park School, in 1983, to form a new school: Heaton Manor School.

Originally, the sixth form (Years 12 and 13) were going to be housed on the former Manor Park site, but this was not possible due to the nature of the buildings.

The former Heaton Grammar site (located on Jesmond Park West) became known as the "Jesmond Site", whilst the former Manor Park site (located on Benton Road) became known as the "Benton Site". The rooms on the Jesmond site had a "J-" prefix (e.g. J44, JP1, JD1) to distinguish the same rooms over on the Benton site which had a "B-" prefix (e.g. B75, BP2, BD1)

Before 2001, the library was found on the upper south-west corridor and there were two halls (east and west). In 2001, the west hall became a new "Learning Resource Centre" and the former library suite was rebuilt and became a British Airways sponsored suite for those studying Travel and Tourism.

Back in 1998, a number of students were featured along with John Dryden and Ann Smedley (Headteacher and Deputy Headteacher respectively) on the front page of the Evening Chronicle with the headline "Thanks a Mi££ion!" after Heaton Manor had secured money for a complete refurbishment.

Building of the new school
Building work commenced in 2002 with the new school being built "upon" the old one – which required the East half of the school to be demolished in the summer of 2003 and work to commence on the footprint of the old east side and the front and back fields. This meant that from September 2003 until the summer of 2004, the school was truly half old, half new. Three new buildings were open for use and the west side of the old building was still being used.

After July 2004, the Benton Road site was closed and soon after was demolished, to make way for the housing development named after it, as "Manor Park".  The remaining old buildings on the Jesmond site were then fully demolished and the remainder of the new buildings were built.

The new school was ready for service in September 2004.

Jesmond Park Academy
A 2018 Ofsted inspection judged Heaton Manor School 'Inadequate,' the lowest of four rating classications. Due to the inadequate judgement, it was announced that the school would become an academy, starting on the 2019–2020 academic year under the Gosforth Federated Academies Trust. The new academy caused controversy in the local community as it discarded the area that it was located, Heaton, with the new name, Jesmond Park Academy.

However, a 2022 Ofsted report for Jesmond Park Academy indicated performance had improved to 'good,' which is the second highest ranking classification, representing a significant improvement in the school's quality.

Academic performance

In 2018, the school's Progress 8 score at GCSE was below average, but the Attainment 8 score was above average.

Activities
There is an extensive "period seven" programme which offers extra-curricular activities. There are many sports teams as well as "booster" lessons in most subjects. Heaton Manor is also a member of Amnesty International. The school participates in many sporting competitions.

Debating
One of the period seven activities that was offered was the Heaton Manor Union Society, which was the school's Debating Society for students in Key Stages Three and Four. The Society was founded in 2006 by the Department of Citizenship. Its weekly meetings involved a debate on a pre-released topic, featuring two pairs arguing for or against the motion respectively.  A vote is held, and a team of judges also selected a winner.  On 10 May 2008, two of the Society's members participated in the national finals of the International Competition for Young Debaters, in Oxford.  This was widely regarded as a great achievement, as very few comprehensive schools qualified.

Heaton Manor also maintained a Post 16 debating team, "The Head Strong Club". They participated multiple times in the National Institute of Ideas Debating Matters competition, progressing to the National Finals in 2005 having won the North East regional heats, as well as competing in the prestigious English-Speaking Union Schools Mace.

Notable former pupils

Sammy Ameobi, Professional Footballer for Newcastle United
Shola Ameobi, Professional Footballer for Newcastle United and Nigeria
Hilary Boulding, President of Trinity College, Oxford and former Principal of the Royal Welsh College of Music and Drama
Chris Donald, Founder of Viz
Simon Donald, Founder of Viz
Charlie Hunnam, Actor
Paul Smith, Professional Cricketer
Jimmy Nail, Actor

References

External links
 

Secondary schools in Newcastle upon Tyne
1928 establishments in England
Educational institutions established in 1928
Academies in Newcastle upon Tyne
People educated at Heaton Grammar School